Matt Moonen is an American politician from Maine. A Democrat from Portland, he was first elected to the Maine House of Representatives in 2012. Moonen, who could not run for reelection to the House in 2020 due to term limits, was a candidate for Maine Secretary of State before losing to Shenna Bellows.

Moonen, who is openly gay, is the Executive Director of EqualityMaine. He is married to Jeremy Kennedy, Chief of Staff to Maine Governor Janet Mills.

References

1984 births
21st-century American politicians
Gay politicians
American LGBT rights activists
LGBT state legislators in Maine
Living people
Majority leaders of the Maine House of Representatives
Democratic Party members of the Maine House of Representatives
Northwestern University alumni
Politicians from Portland, Maine